The 2017–18 season was UANL's first competitive season and first season in the Liga MX Femenil, the top flight of Mexican women's football.

UANL qualified for the Apertura 2017 playoffs after finishing second during the regular phase of the tournament, but were eliminated in semifinals by Pachuca.

For the next tournament, Tigres finished third and this time managed to win the Clausura 2018 after defeating Monterrey in penalties in the women's version of the Clásico Regiomontano.

Squad

Apertura

Clausura

Transfers

In

Coaching staff

Competitions

Overview

Torneo Apertura

League table

Matches

Playoffs

Semifinals

Torneo Clausura

League table

Matches

Playoffs

Semifinals

Final

Statistics

Appearances and goals

|-

|-
! colspan=10 style=background:#dcdcdc | Players that left the club during the season
|-

|}

Goalscorers

Hat-tricks

Own goals

References

Tigres UANL (women) seasons
Mexican football clubs 2017–18 season